Nockowa  is a village in the administrative district of Gmina Iwierzyce, within Ropczyce-Sędziszów County, Subcarpathian Voivodeship, in south-eastern Poland.

The village has a population of 1,200.

References

Nockowa